Sea Wolf is a naval surface-to-air missile system designed and built by BAC, later to become British Aerospace (BAe) Dynamics, and now MBDA. It is an automated point-defence weapon system designed as a short-range defence against both sea-skimming and high angle anti-ship missiles and aircraft. The Royal Navy has fielded two versions, the GWS-25 Conventionally Launched Sea Wolf (CLSW) and the GWS-26 Vertically Launched Sea Wolf (VLSW) forms. In Royal Navy service Sea Wolf is being replaced by Sea Ceptor.

History

The earliest point-defence missile used by the Royal Navy was the Seacat, which had been rapidly developed from an earlier anti-tank missile design, the Malkara. As a weapon originally designed to operate against slow-moving ground vehicles, the missile had subsonic performance and was of limited capability against even early jet aircraft. It was used largely due to the ease which it could be adapted to the role simply by replacing the original wire guidance system with a radio command link, and that its small size allowed multi-round launchers to be fitted to ships in place of their Bofors 40 mm guns. It entered service in 1961, the first point-defence missile to do so.

The limited performance was understood to be a problem from the start and a requirement for a higher performance replacement was published in 1964. British Aircraft Corporation (BAC) won a 1967 development contract along with Vickers and Bristol Aerojet. Although only slightly longer and heavier than Seacat, Sea Wolf offered dramatically higher performance, with a top speed on the order of Mach 3, an effective range roughly double that of Seacat, and a fully automated guidance system that made engagements much simpler.

Testing lasted from 1970 until 1977, with shipborne trials on a modified Leander class frigate, from 1976. Sea Wolf was tested with a vertical launch system early in the development period on a modified Loch class frigate,  but for obscure reasons work did not continue in this direction: the GWS-26 "VL Seawolf (VLS)" being a much later (1980s) development. During trials, the missile performed impressively, once intercepting a  shell.

The first deployment, in the GWS-25 form, was on the Type 22 frigate (2 systems) and later on modified Leander class frigates (1 system) in six-round, manually-loaded trainable launchers. It entered service with the Royal Navy in 1979 and was used during the Falklands War. The current version is the GWS-26 Mod 1 system on Type 23 frigates, fielding 32 vertical launch missiles (VL Sea Wolf) in its missile silo. It is expected to remain in service until 2020.

Description
The warhead weighs  and is a proximity fuzed HE-fragmenting type. In the manually loaded form, the missiles are stored on board in maintenance-free canisters, sealed until use and handled like a round of ammunition.

Fire control

The standard mode is fully automated and uses radar tracking. Target detection is carried out using the ship's surveillance radars. In the Type 22- and Sea Wolf-equipped Leander class, this was the radar Type 967–968 combination; the D-band Type 967 providing long-range surveillance and the E-band Type 968 providing short-range target indication. On the Type 23 frigates, these functions have been taken over by the Type 996 3D surveillance radar. Target data is processed by the ship's computers and when the system is live, targets are automatically assigned and engaged automatically (although this can be over-ridden by the Missile Director (MD) in the Operations Room).

When a target is to be engaged, the ship's computer slews one of the two Sea Wolf trackers onto the target (there was a single tracker on a Sea Wolf Leander). Originally the Type 910, with an I-band radar, was used but this suffered from poor performance locking onto low-altitude targets hidden in the background sea clutter in the Falklands War. Low-level targets had to be engaged using the 910's secondary TV mode to manually track the target. The lighter Type 911 supplanted the Type 910, adding a second radar (a K-band set based on the Blindfire tracker of the Rapier missile, to control engagements at low level) and was fitted in the 7th Type 22 Frigate onwards. Unlike Type 910, Type 911 does not have any TV function; the TV camera is retained only to allow the Missile Director to visually confirm targets and to provide a record of engagements.

When lock has been achieved with the missile tracker a round is fired and tracked by a pair of radio beacons in the missile's tail. The ship-board system constantly measures the angle differences between the target and the missile and issues guidance commands to the missile through an Automatic Command to Line of Sight (ACLOS) device transmitting on a microwave link controlling the rear fins of the missile. It is possible for a tracker to control a salvo of two missiles. The radar and CCTV guidance system were developed by Marconi Radar at Great Baddow, Essex.

Combat performance

During the Falklands War, Sea Wolf was the Royal Navy's only modern point-defence weapon. It equipped the Type 22 frigates HMS Brilliant,  and the Batch 3A Leander class frigate . These ships were assigned "goalkeeper" duties, to provide close anti-aircraft defence of the carrier task force.

The pairing was unofficially termed "Type 64", the sum of both classes numbers. The two pairs were deployed some distance from the main fleet, covering likely attack routes, in an attempt to draw attacking aircraft into a "missile trap", the intention being that, if the Type 42 was unable to engage targets at longer ranges with its Sea Dart missiles, the Type 22 would use its short-range Sea Wolf missiles to defend both ships.

Brilliant shot down two of these and caused a third to crash trying to avoid the missile. The second wave of aircraft attacked during a failure of the missile system and the Type 42 Glasgow sustained damage.

On 25 May 1982,  and Broadsword also operating in a 22/42 combination to the north-west of Falkland Sound came under attack by two waves of two A-4 Skyhawks.  Broadsword attempted to target the first pair with Sea Wolf but the tracking system locked down and could not be reset before the aircraft released their bombs.  Broadsword was hit by one bomb, which bounced up through the deck and destroyed her Westland Lynx helicopter.  The second pair of Skyhawks headed for Coventry 90 seconds later at a 20-degree angle to her port bow. On Broadsword the Sea Wolf system had been reset and acquired the attacking aircraft but Coventrys evasive manoeuvring took her through the line of fire and the lock was lost.  Coventry was struck by three bombs and sank shortly after.

Sea Wolf suffered from problems with hardware failure causing launches to fail, broken locks from the extreme sea conditions and the Argentines' low-altitude hit-and-run tactics with multiple, crossing targets which it was not designed to intercept.

Sea Wolf accounted for three confirmed "kills" and two further possibles from eight launches.

Variants

Vertical launch (VL) Sea Wolf GWS-26
Instead of a launcher that is aimed at the target by the fire-control system, VL Sea Wolf uses a vertical-launch system (VLS). Missiles are launched vertically by a Cadiz booster motor and turnover pack, to clear the ship's superstructure and rapidly flipped onto their flight path by thrust vectoring.

Although vertical launch had been explored much earlier in Sea Wolf's development, it was not until the 1980s that a production design was undertaken. VLS went into service, using the GWS-26 system, on the Type 23 frigate . Type 23 frigates have a 32-cell VLS, each cell holding one VL Sea Wolf for a total of 32 missiles. The cells, or canisters, are housed vertically in the ship's magazine such that the top of the canisters protrude from the magazine.

Block 2
Block 2 Sea Wolf is a replenishment upgrade to the existing stocks of Sea Wolf missiles. Block 2 missiles have replaced all Sea Wolf missiles, both on Type 22 and Type 23 frigates, as part of normal ammunition replenishment operations. In a parallel programme ("Sea Wolf Mid-Life Update") the associated Type 911 tracker is being upgraded by the addition of an infra-red camera, enhanced tracking software and new operator's consoles.

GWS-27
Proposed "fire-and-forget" development with an active radar seeker instead of command guidance for dealing with saturation attacks. GWS-27 was cancelled in 1987.

Lightweight Sea Wolf

The "broad-beam" Leander-class frigate of  standard displacement could carry only a single missile system, and required some significant structural "surgery" of the upperworks to counteract the weight of the new missile system. Sea Wolf in its original guise cannot therefore be easily added to existing vessels. For this reason, the Lightweight Sea Wolf variant was designed to use a four-missile launcher, similar in form to that of the obsolete Sea Cat system. It was intended to equip the Royal Navy's Invincible class carriers and Type 42 destroyers to supplement the medium range Sea Dart system, which was not as capable of intercepting sea-skimming missiles. However, it was cancelled before it entered service.

Replacement

At the DSEi conference in September 2007 it was announced that the UK Ministry of Defence was funding a study by MBDA to investigate a replacement for Sea Wolf which is scheduled to leave service about 2018. MBDA was later contracted to replace the Vertical-Launch Sea Wolf weapons system on the Royal Navy's Type 23 frigates as part of the Future Local Anti-air Defence System (Maritime) or FLAADS(M). The system chosen is the Common Anti-Air Modular Missile (CAMM) which will be known in Royal Navy service as "Sea Ceptor". It will enter service on all of the Type 23 frigate from around 2016 onwards and will be migrated in time to the Type 26 global combat ships early in the next decade, providing a local air defence capability for the Royal Navy for the next 30 years or so. The CAMM will share components with the ASRAAM missile in service with the RAF.

Operators

Current operators

Former operators

See also
List of missiles
CAMM - Also known as 'Sea Ceptor' will replace the Sea Wolf missile in service with the Royal Navy.
Barak 1
RIM-113

References

Citations

Bibliography

Tras un manto de neblina. Breve crónica de la Guerra de las Malvinas, Mario Díaz Gavier, Córdoba, 2004

Naval Armament, Doug Richardson, Jane's Publishing, 1981

External links

Jane's Defence news on Seawolf Block 2, April 2006
Global Security
Seawolf v Exocet - test detailed (Flight International 1983)

Close-in weapon systems
Naval weapons of the United Kingdom
Naval surface-to-air missiles
British Aircraft Corporation
Surface-to-air missiles of the United Kingdom
Military equipment introduced in the 1970s